is a Japanese figure skater. She is the 2018 World silver medalist and a five-time Japanese national medalist (bronze in 2015, silver in 2016, 2017, 2020, and 2022). On the junior level, she is a two-time World Junior bronze medalist (2015, 2016), the 2014–15 Junior Grand Prix Final bronze medalist, and a two-time Japan Junior national champion (2015, 2016). She won a bronze medal in team event, representing Japan at the 2022 Winter Olympics.

Higuchi is currently the 11th highest ranked women's singles skater in the world by the International Skating Union following the 2021–22 figure skating season. She is the seventeenth woman to land a clean triple Axel internationally and the fifth woman to land a clean triple Axel at the Olympics.

Personal life
Wakaba Higuchi was born January 2, 2001, in Tokyo, Japan. She is the youngest of three children — her brother, Daisuke, and sister, Saki, are five and eight years older, respectively.

Career

Early career 
Higuchi began skating at age three. She appeared internationally on the novice level for three seasons beginning in 2011–2012. She won novice titles at the Gardena Spring Trophy, International Challenge Cup, and Asian Trophy.

As the 2013 Japanese national novice champion, she was invited to skate in the gala at the 2013 NHK Trophy and 2014 World Championships.

2014–2015 season: World Junior bronze 
In the 2014–2015 season, Higuchi became age-eligible for international junior competitions. Having opened her season at the Asian Trophy, she made her Junior Grand Prix (JGP) debut in Ostrava, Czech Republic, taking silver. With a gold medal at her second JGP event in Dresden, Germany, she qualified for the 2014–15 JGP Final. Higuchi won the Japanese national junior title in November before competing at the JGP Final in Barcelona, Spain. Ranked fifth in the short program and third in the free skate, she finished third overall, behind Evgenia Medvedeva and Serafima Sakhanovich. She then took the bronze medal in her senior national debut at the Japan Championships. In her first appearance at the World Junior Championships, she won the bronze medal after placing third in the short program and second in the free skate.

As the Junior World bronze medalist, she was invited to skate in the gala at the 2015 World Team Trophy.

2015–2016 season: Second World Junior bronze 
At the beginning of the 2015–2016 season, Higuchi suffered from a back injury. Competing in the JGP series, she finished fifth in Linz, Austria before winning silver, behind teammate Marin Honda, in Zagreb, Croatia.

After repeating as the national junior champion, Higuchi edged Mao Asada by 1.6 points for the senior silver medal at the Japan Championships. In March, she competed at the World Junior Championships in Debrecen, Hungary. Ranked fifth in the short program and second in the free skate, she was awarded her second consecutive bronze medal, behind Honda and Maria Sotskova.

2016–2017 season: Senior debut 
Making her senior international debut, Higuchi won gold at the 2016 CS Lombardia Trophy in Bergamo, Italy. She also competed at the 2016 Japan Open. She placed fifth in the individual event and first as a member of Team Japan in the team event. Higuchi's first Grand Prix event was the 2016 Trophée de France in Paris, France. She placed fifth in the short program, third in the free skate, and third overall. At her second Grand Prix event of the season, the 2016 NHK Trophy, Higuchi placed fifth in the short program, fourth in the free skate, and fourth overall.

At the 2016–17 Japan Championships, Higuchi placed third in the short program and fourth in the free skate but was still able to earn the silver medal behind Satoko Miyahara. She was assigned to compete at the 2017 Four Continents Championships and the 2017 World Championships. At the Four Continents Championships, she placed tenth in the short program, ninth in the free skate, and ninth overall. She placed ninth in the short program, twelfth in the free skate, and eleventh overall at the World Championships. Higuchi ended her season at the 2017 World Team Trophy. She earned three personal best scores at this competition, finishing fifth in the short program, third in the free skate, and third overall. She won the team event with Team Japan as well.

2017–2018 season: World silver 
Higuchi competed at the 2017 Lombardia Trophy and scored new personal bests for the short program and combined total to win the silver medal. On the Grand Prix, Higuchi won the bronze medal at the 2017 Rostelecom Cup. She won the silver medal at the 2017 Cup of China. Her results qualified her for her first senior Grand Prix Final, held in Nagoya, Japan where she placed sixth overall.

At the 2017–18 Japan Figure Skating Championships, Higuchi finished fourth behind Satoko Miyahara, Kaori Sakamoto, and Rika Kihira. She was not named to the Japanese Olympic team, but based on her international results throughout the season she was named to the 2018 World Championships team.

At the 2018 World Championships in Milan, Italy, Higuchi placed eighth in the short program and scored 65.89 points after falling on her combination. In the free skating, she performed a clean program, scoring 145.01 points to place second in that segment of the competition. She was the only skater that evening who did not receive a single negative grade of execution mark from the judges. She won the silver medal overall, finishing behind Kaetlyn Osmond and ahead of her compatriot Satoko Miyahara. Her free skating program, set to music from various James Bond films and choreographed by Shae-Lynn Bourne, was voted "the best ladies' free skate of the 2017–18 season" in a poll organized by the skating portal Ice Network.

2018–2019 season: Injury struggles 
Higuchi finished fifth at her first event of the season, the 2018 CS Autumn Classic International. In October, Japanese news media reported that she had injured the instep of her right foot. At her first Grand Prix assignment of the year, the 2018 Skate Canada International, she placed second in the short program, but several errors put her seventh in the free skate, and sixth overall. Higuchi then withdrew from the 2018 Rostelecom Cup, her second Grand Prix assignment for the year. She then proceeded to win Tokyo Regionals.

At the 2018 Japan Championships, she placed fourth in the short program and seventh in the free skate to place fifth overall.

2019–2020 season: Comeback 
Beginning the season at the 2019 CS Lombardia Trophy, Higuchi finished in eighth place after numerous errors. Proceeding to the Grand Prix series, her first assignment was the 2019 Skate America. Higuchi placed third in the short program, landing all her jumps cleanly in that segment, after which she described herself as "really happy to skate a clean program after a long time. I think it has been two years since I skated a program at this level." She struggled in the free skate, dropping to sixth place overall. She was sixth as well at the 2019 Internationaux de France.

Higuchi resumed training the triple Axel in the lead-up to the 2019–20 Japanese Championships, planning to attempt one in the free skate. She placed fourth in the short program, narrowly behind third-place Kaori Sakamoto, after stepping out of the second part of her jump combination and receiving a flip edge call. After being unable to land any triple Axels in the practice session before the free skate, she elected not to attempt it there and placed second in the segment behind Rika Kihira, taking the silver medal. Her only error in the segment was stepping out on a triple flip that was also given an edge call.

Competing at the 2020 Four Continents Championships, Higuchi placed fifth in the short program, the only issue being an edge call on her flip. In the free skate, she attempted the triple Axel in competition for the first time, rotating the jump successfully but falling on it. Higuchi also made a few other minor jump errors, placing fifth in the free segment for fourth place overall. She was then assigned to compete at the World Championships in Montreal, but these were cancelled as a result of the coronavirus pandemic.

2020–2021 season 
Higuchi competed at the 2020 Japan Open and finished second after Mako Yamashita with 123.01 points. She landed her triple Axel in the competition but stepped out on the landing edge. Competing domestically, she won the Eastern Sectionals by almost thirty points.

Higuchi began the international season at the 2020 NHK Trophy, where she won the silver medal, her first appearance on the ISU Grand Prix podium since the 2017–18 season. Higuchi came in second in the short program after she fell on her attempted triple Axel in the short program but landed all her other jumping passes. In the free skate, Higuchi landed the triple Axel as her opening element, albeit marked as landed on the quarter under rotation, but went on to double the planned triple Salchow and triple Lutz jumps. She was fourth in that segment of the competition but remained in second place behind Kaori Sakamoto. This marked the first podium she had stood on at a major international competition since winning silver at the 2018 World Championships.

Higuchi entered the 2020–21 Japan Championships as a favorite for the podium but placed thirteenth in the short program after falling on her triple Axel and executing only a double toe loop as the second part of her jump combination. Eighth in the free skate, she rose to seventh place overall.

2021–2022 season: Beijing Olympics 
Higuchi began the season on the Grand Prix at the 2021 Skate Canada International, where she placed fifth in both programs and sixth overall. In the free skate, she landed a ratified triple Axel for the first time in international competition. At the 2021 CS Cup of Austria, she landed a ratified triple Axel in the short program for the first time internationally and set a new personal best after the segment. She struggled in the free skate, finishing fourth in that segment, but still won the gold medal, 5.36 points ahead of silver medalist Park Yeon-jeong. Competing the following weekend at her second Grand Prix, the 2021 Internationaux de France, Higuchi was sixth in the short program after singling her triple Axel attempt. She rallied in the free skate to place third in that segment and rise to the bronze medal position. She said afterward that her next goal was to "aim for 145 points and a perfect performance at Nationals".

With the 2021–22 Japan Championships serving as the final national qualification contest for the 2022 Winter Olympics, Higuchi placed second in both segments to take the silver medal. She did not attempt a triple Axel in the short program and landed it with a step out at the beginning of the free skate. She was named to the Japanese Olympic team, four years after missing it by one placement.

Higuchi began the 2022 Winter Olympics as the Japanese entry in the women's short program segment of the Olympic team event. She opted not to attempt a triple Axel and skated a clean short program, finishing second in the segment and securing nine points for Japan. She did not skate in the free segment, which was given to national champion Kaori Sakamoto. Team Japan won bronze, Higuchi's first Olympic medal and the first podium finish for the country in that event. In the women's event, she landed a triple Axel cleanly but had two other triple jumps called as underrotated in addition to receiving an edge call on her flip, placing fifth with a score of 73.51. She said after that, "the score was not as high as I expected, and I think that is the only pity I had for this performance." Higuchi became the fifth woman to land a triple Axel at the Olympic Games. Sixth in the free skate, she remained fifth overall. She landed the triple Axel successfully again and said, "I had a bite of the bitter part of the Games, " in that she did not make the podium, "but also the sweet part of it. It's the best stepping stone for my athletic life in the next four years."

Days after the Olympics concluded, Vladimir Putin ordered an invasion of Ukraine, as a result of which the International Skating Union banned all Russian and Belarusian skaters from competing at the 2022 World Championships. This had a major impact on the women's field, which Russians dominated for most of the preceding eight years. As a result, Higuchi entered the championships considered a major medal contender. In the short program, she doubled and stepped out of an attempted triple Axel and received an edge call on her triple flip, finishing seventh in the segment. Twelfth in the free skate, she finished eleventh overall.

Higuchi sustained a stress fracture in her right shin in late April 2022.

2022–2023 season
Due to the stress fracture, Higuchi withdrew from both of her Grand Prix events – the 2022 Skate Canada International and 2022 NHK Trophy – and stated that she would miss the entire season.

Programs

Competitive highlights 

GP: Grand Prix; CS: Challenger Series; JGP: Junior Grand Prix

Detailed results

Senior level 

Small medals for short and free programs awarded only at ISU Championships. At team events, medals awarded for team results only. ISU Personal best highlighted in bold.

Junior level 

Small medals for short and free programs awarded only at ISU Championships.

References

External links 

 
 wakabahiguchi.com 
 
 

2001 births
Japanese female single skaters
Living people
Sportspeople from Tokyo
World Figure Skating Championships medalists
World Junior Figure Skating Championships medalists
Olympic figure skaters of Japan
Figure skaters at the 2022 Winter Olympics
Medalists at the 2022 Winter Olympics
Olympic bronze medalists for Japan
Olympic medalists in figure skating